Nathan Rafferty (born 17 January 2000) is a Northern Irish professional darts player who currently competes in the Professional Darts Corporation (PDC) events.

Career
Rafferty made his TV debut on the 2018 UK Open where beat Jason Mold in round 2, before defeating the defending champion Peter Wright in round 3, eventually losing to Robert Owen.

He has won four Development Tour titles, one in 2018 and 2019 and two in 2021. He has also won a Challenge Tour title.

World Championship results

PDC
 2023: Second round (lost to Michael Smith 0–3)

Performance timeline

PDC European Tour

References

External links

2000 births
Living people
Darts players from Northern Ireland
Professional Darts Corporation current tour card holders